The Diseases Prevention (Metropolis) Act (46 & 47 Vict c 35) was an Act of Parliament of the United Kingdom passed in 1883, during the reign of Queen Victoria. Earlier in the century the Metropolitan Asylums Board (MAB) had been established under the Metropolitan Poor Act 1867 to deal with London's sick poor, run as a Poor Law institution. But under increasing pressure resulting from a series of smallpox epidemics in the early 1880s a Royal Commission was set up in 1881 to investigate how best to deal with those suffering from infectious diseases. The commission recommended that the provision of hospital treatment for those with infectious diseases should be decoupled from the Poor Law, and instead be considered part of London's sanitary arrangements. The commission also recommended that paupers and non-paupers should be treated alike, although there might be separate wards for those able to pay. The subsequent Disease Prevention (Metropolis) Act of 1883 effectively abolished the distinction between paupers and non-paupers in the provision of the MAB's hospital care. It also had the effect of permitting workhouse infirmaries to treat paying non-paupers as well as their own inmates, and by the beginning of the 20th century some were even able to operate as private hospitals.

References

Citations

Bibliography

1883 in London
United Kingdom Acts of Parliament 1883
Acts of the Parliament of the United Kingdom concerning England
Poor law infirmaries